Begum Para is the symbolic name of second abode of Bangladeshi looter-corruption. Literally the term refers to an area, but basically it is nothing but a money laundering scandal in Bangladesh. This scandal arose in 2019-2020, when it started coming to light in various newspapers and the foreign ministry of Bangladesh found the connection of money launderers to the Begum Para that various assets are being purchased in Canada with dollars looted out of Bangladesh. There is actually no place specifically called 'Begum Para' in Canada. It is actually residences bought with laundered dollars, where the families of Bangladeshi dishonest-corrupt businessmen-bureaucrats-politicians live comfortably, safely and luxuriously in Toronto, Canada. Bangladeshi immigrants in Canada and local Bangladeshi people basically refer to all those looters as Begum Para residents.

Most of the launderers are Bangladeshi government officials, followed by politicians and businessmen. In Begum Para, wives and children of Bangladeshi extra-opulent people live a luxurious life with the illegal money sent by their husbands. Retiring from their job, the guys go to their Begums (wives) in Canada. For this reason, these places have been named Begum Para.

History 
Begum Para is a Bangla term, which is basically a big money laundering scandal in Bangladesh. However the term literally indicates a symbolic area located somewhere in Canada. It is not a formally or historically created area. Basically, this Bangla term is used by Bangladeshi people to convey a special meaning. To the Bangladeshi people, media and legislative bodies, the term Begum Para refers to houses or places of residence purchased in Canada with smuggled dollars by money launderers.

Although Begum Para is a derived form of Urdu word, but completely has a different meaning. The Bangla term Begum Para has originally derived from the Urdu Begumpura. Urdu Begumpura means colony of wives in the Greater Toronto Area whose husbands used to leave their wives in the area and go elsewhere in search of work.

Location 

Even though Begum Para is a Bangladeshi scandal, but it originated from somewhere of Canada. Former Bangladeshi Ambassador M Sirajul Islam told a story in Britain's Independent newspaper that an area of Toronto, Canada is called as 'Begum Para' by the Bangladeshis. Since this is a symbolic area, no area officially renamed in Canada by this name. This Bangla term also includes properties purchased with laundered money in other Canadian cities outside of Toronto. However, based on information obtained by journalists, one area of Canada that can be specifically identified as Begum Para is Scarborough, because most Bangladeshi looters have purchased properties in this area.

The Canadian government has so far tracked down 200 Bangladeshi looters but does not disclose information. As expatriates, the number is more than a thousand. They also purchased assets in luxury high-rise condominiums in the Bellevue Square Park, the heart of Toronto in the vicinity of the CN Tower, the upscale homes of Richmond Hill, and elite areas of Mississauga and Markham adjacent to Toronto. Not only these, there are many other areas, which names have not yet been come to light.

Controversy 
Begum Para of Toronto in Canada is an open secret and has become a hot cake of political discussions as many Bangladeshis have bought luxurious residences in Begum Para and spending millions laundered from Bangladesh. The Anti-Corruption Commission asked the government to provide a list of its officials who bought homes in Begum Para. The Bangladesh Financial Intelligence Unit informed to the court that they had requested the financial intelligence unit of Canada to provide the information of all Bangladeshi persons who might have laundered money from Bangladesh to Canada in the response of Begum Para controversy. In a press briefing, Foreign Minister Abulkalam Abdul Momen said, “Our general idea is that politicians live there. However, it is found that most of them are the government officials. Retired or still employed, they bought a house. Their sons and daughters live in big houses. Some of our businessmen have bought houses there as well.” It is reported that the fugitive PK Haldar has also settled in Begum Para after smuggling 3600 crore BDT.

According to Global Financial Integrity, a Washington-based research firm, around US$ 6 billion was smuggled out of Bangladesh in 2015 through trade manipulation. Referring to money laundering, bank and stock market looting, Hussain Muhammad Ershad in his 2014 budget speech said, "Money is being smuggled into Malaysia and Canada. Some people are setting their home there. They have built Begum Para in Canada. Where did they get so much money?"

See also 

 Bangladeshi Canadians
 Bangladesh-Canada relations

References 

2020 scandals
Financial scandals
Corruption in Bangladesh
Political scandals in Bangladesh
Bangladesh–Canada relations
Asian Canadian
 
Bangladeshi diaspora by country